Kundurkhe (Dargwa: Кундурхи) is a rural locality (a selo) in Kuppinsky Selsoviet, Levashinsky District, Republic of Dagestan, Russia. The population was 375 as of 2010. There are 4 streets.

Geography 
It is located 16 km west of Levashi.

Nationalities 
Dargins live there.

References 

Rural localities in Levashinsky District